is an underground metro station on the Sendai Subway Nanboku Line in Taihaku-ku, Sendai, Miyagi Prefecture, Japan.

Lines

Station layout
Nagamachi-Itchōme Station is an underground station with a single island platform serving two tracks.

Platforms

History
Nagamachi-Itchōme Station opened on 15 July 1987.

Passenger statistics
In fiscal 2015, the station was used by an average of 3,608 passengers daily.

Surrounding area
Sendai- Nagamachi Post Office

References

External links

 

Railway stations in Sendai
Sendai Subway Namboku Line
Railway stations in Japan opened in 1987